The Australian/Vogel Literary Award is an Australian literary award for unpublished manuscripts by writers under the age of 35. The prize money, currently A$20,000, is the richest and most prestigious award for an unpublished manuscript in Australia. The rules of the competition include that the winner's work be published by Allen & Unwin.

The award was initiated in 1979 by Niels Stevns and is a collaboration between The Australian newspaper, the publisher Allen & Unwin, and Stevns & Company Pty Ltd. Stevns, founder of the company which makes Vogel bread, named the award in honour of Swiss naturopath Alfred Vogel.

Winners
2022 – Nell Pierce, A Place Near Eden
2021 – Emma Batchelor, Now That I See You
2020 – K. M. Kruimink, A Treacherous Country
2019 – No prize awarded
2018 – Emily O'Grady, The Yellow House
2017 – Marija Peričić, The Lost Pages
2016 – Katherine Brabon, The Memory Artist
2015 – Murray Middleton, When There’s Nowhere Else to Run
2014 – Christine Piper, After Darkness
2013 – No prize awarded
2012 – Paul D. Carter, Eleven Seasons
2011 – Rohan Wilson, The Roving Party
2010 – not awarded – Allen & Unwin Publishers decided to change the announcement of the winner to coincide with the publication of the book.
2009 – Kristel Thornell, Night Street and Lisa Lang, Utopian Man
2008 – Andrew Croome, Document Z
2007 – Stefan Laszczuk, I Dream of Magda
2006 – Belinda Castles, The River Baptists
2005 – Andrew O'Connor, Tuvalu
2004 – Julienne van Loon, Road Story
2003 – Nicholas Angel, Drown Them in the Sea and Ruth Balint, Troubled Waters
2002 – Danielle Wood, The Alphabet of Light and Dark
2001 – Sarah Hay, Skins 
2000 – Stephen Gray, The Artist is a Thief
1999 – Hsu-Ming Teo, Love and Vertigo
1998 – Jennifer Kremmer, Pegasus in the Suburbs
1997 – Eva Sallis, Hiam
1996 – Bernard Cohen, The Blindman's Hat
1995 – Richard King, Kindling Does For Firewood
1994 – Darren Williams, Swimming in Silk
1993 – Helen Demidenko, The Hand That Signed the Paper
1992 – Fotini Epanomitis, The Mule's Foal
1991 – Andrew McGahan, Praise
1990 – Gillian Mears, The Mint Lawn
1989 – Mandy Sayer, Mood Indigo
1988 – Tom Flood, Oceana Fine
1987 – Jim Sakkas, Ilias
1986 – Robin Walton, Glace Fruits
1985 – No prize awarded
1984 – Kate Grenville, Lilian's Story
1983 – Jenny Summerville, Shields of Trell
1982 – Brian Castro, Birds of Passage and Nigel Krauth, Matilda, My Darling
1981 – Chris Matthews, Al Jazzar and Tim Winton, An Open Swimmer
1980 – Archie Weller, The Day of the Dog (Weller was initially runner-up to Paul Radley, who was disqualified after admitting that his manuscript was actually written by his uncle, who was also older than 35.)

Notes

References
Goodwin, Ken (1986) A History of Australian Literature, Basingstoke, Macmillan
The History of The Australian/Vogel Literary Award (Allen & Unwin)

Australian literary awards
Awards established in 1979